God Rides a Harley is a Canadian documentary film, directed by Stavros C. Stavrides and released in 1987. The film profiles the Christian Riders motorcycle club, a group of bikers in Toronto who converted to Christianity.

The film won the Genie Award for Best Feature Length Documentary at the 9th Genie Awards.

References

External links
 

1987 films
1987 documentary films
Canadian documentary films
Best Documentary Film Genie and Canadian Screen Award winners
Documentary films about Christianity
Motorcycling films
1980s English-language films
1980s Canadian films